Exact diagonalization (ED) is a numerical technique used in physics to determine the eigenstates and energy eigenvalues of a quantum Hamiltonian. In this technique, a Hamiltonian for a discrete, finite system is expressed in matrix form and diagonalized using a computer. Exact diagonalization is only feasible for systems with a few tens of particles, due to the exponential growth of the Hilbert space dimension with the size of the quantum system. It is frequently employed to study lattice models, including the Hubbard model, Ising model, Heisenberg model, t-J model, and SYK model.

Expectation values from exact diagonalization
After determining the eigenstates  and energies  of a given Hamiltonian, exact diagonalization can be used to obtain expectation values of observables. For example, if  is an observable, its thermal expectation value is

where  is the partition function. If the observable can be written down in the initial basis for the problem, then this sum can be evaluated after transforming to the basis of eigenstates.

Green's functions may be evaluated similarly. For example, the retarded Green's function  can be written

Exact diagonalization can also be used to determine the time evolution of a system after a quench. Suppose the system has been prepared in an initial state , and then for time  evolves under a new Hamiltonian, . The state at time  is

Memory requirements
The dimension of the Hilbert space describing a quantum system scales exponentially with system size. For example, consider a system of  spins localized on fixed lattice sites. The full system has dimension , and the Hamiltonian represented as a matrix has size . This implies that computation time and memory requirements scale very unfavorably in exact diagonalization. In practice, the memory requirements can be reduced by taking advantage of symmetry of the problem, imposing conservation laws, working with sparse matrices, or using other techniques.

Comparison with other techniques
Exact diagonalization is useful for extracting exact information about finite systems. However, often small systems are studied to gain insight into infinite lattice systems. If the diagonalized system is too small, its properties will not reflect the properties of the system in the thermodynamic limit, and the simulation is said to suffer from finite size effects. 

Unlike some other exact theory techniques, such as Auxiliary-field Monte Carlo, exact diagonalization obtains Green's functions directly in real time, as opposed to imaginary time. Unlike in these other techniques, exact diagonalization results do not need to be numerically analytically continued. This is an advantage, because numerical analytic continuation is an ill-posed and difficult optimization problem.

Applications
 Can be used as an impurity solver for Dynamical mean-field theory techniques.

 When combined with finite size scaling, estimating the ground state energy and critical exponents of the 1D transverse-field Ising model.

 Studying various properties of the 2D Heisenberg model in a magnetic field, including antiferromagnetism and spin-wave velocity.

 Studying the Drude weight of the 2D Hubbard model.

 Studying out-of-time-order correlations (OTOCs) and scrambling in the SYK model.

 Simulating resonant x-ray spectra of strongly correlated materials.

Implementations
Numerous software packages implementing exact diagonalization of quantum Hamiltonians exist. These include QuSpin, ALPS, DoQo, EdLib,  edrixs, and many others.

Generalizations
Exact diagonalization results from many small clusters can be combined to obtain more accurate information about systems in the thermodynamic limit using the numerical linked cluster expansion.

See also
 Lanczos algorithm

References

External links
Quantum Simulation/Exact diagonalization
ALPS full diagonalization tutorial
Exact Diagonalization and Lanczos Method in E. Pavarini, E. Koch and S. Zhang (eds.): Many-Body Methods for Real Materials, Jülich 2019, ISBN 978-3-95806-400-3 

Correlated electrons
Materials science
Condensed matter physics
Quantum mechanics